Hūkerenui is a settlement in Northland, New Zealand. State Highway 1 passes through the area. Kawakawa is northwest, and Hikurangi is southeast.

The New Zealand Ministry for Culture and Heritage gives a translation of "large cascade" for Hukerenui.

History
The settlement began as Hukerenui South in 1886, with a request made by a group of local people for the land under the Village Homestead Special Settlement system. The village was opened to the first 25 settler families the following year. Although the main road from Whangārei to Kawakawa passed through it, the road was only a dirt track, and was impassable during winter. Gum digging was one of the initial sources of income, but the Government cancelled gum-digging licences after fires in early 1888. A flax mill at Towai provided some jobs. Some were employed to build and improve the roads.

The North Auckland railway line reached Hūkerenui in 1901 or 1902. It was extended north to Towai in February or May 1910, and to Kawakawa in 1912 or 1911.

In 2019, the name of the locality was officially gazetted as Hūkerenui.

Demographics
The SA1 area is part of the larger Mangakahia-Hūkerenui statistical area.

Hūkerenui had a population of 195 at the 2018 New Zealand census, an increase of 3 people (1.6%) since the 2013 census, and an increase of 6 people (3.2%) since the 2006 census. There were 57 households, comprising 105 males and 93 females, giving a sex ratio of 1.13 males per female. The median age was 41.6 years (compared with 37.4 years nationally), with 39 people (20.0%) aged under 15 years, 36 (18.5%) aged 15 to 29, 96 (49.2%) aged 30 to 64, and 27 (13.8%) aged 65 or older.

Ethnicities were 92.3% European/Pākehā, 21.5% Māori, 1.5% Pacific peoples, 1.5% Asian, and 1.5% other ethnicities. People may identify with more than one ethnicity.

Although some people chose not to answer the census's question about religious affiliation, 58.5% had no religion, 32.3% were Christian, 1.5% were Buddhist and 1.5% had Māori religious beliefs.

Of those at least 15 years old, 21 (13.5%) people had a bachelor's or higher degree, and 36 (23.1%) people had no formal qualifications. The median income was $26,800, compared with $31,800 nationally. 18 people (11.5%) earned over $70,000 compared to 17.2% nationally. The employment status of those at least 15 was that 84 (53.8%) people were employed full-time, 33 (21.2%) were part-time, and 6 (3.8%) were unemployed.

Mangakahia-Hūkerenui statistical area

Mangakahia-Hūkerenui had a population of 1,923 at the 2018 New Zealand census, an increase of 282 people (17.2%) since the 2013 census, and an increase of 240 people (14.3%) since the 2006 census. There were 627 households, comprising 996 males and 927 females, giving a sex ratio of 1.07 males per female. The median age was 35.9 years (compared with 37.4 years nationally), with 447 people (23.2%) aged under 15 years, 372 (19.3%) aged 15 to 29, 885 (46.0%) aged 30 to 64, and 222 (11.5%) aged 65 or older.

Ethnicities were 71.6% European/Pākehā, 41.0% Māori, 3.1% Pacific peoples, 1.6% Asian, and 1.7% other ethnicities. People may identify with more than one ethnicity.

The percentage of people born overseas was 10.1, compared with 27.1% nationally.

Although some people chose not to answer the census's question about religious affiliation, 50.5% had no religion, 31.8% were Christian, 5.1% had Māori religious beliefs, 0.3% were Buddhist and 1.9% had other religions.

Of those at least 15 years old, 174 (11.8%) people had a bachelor's or higher degree, and 321 (21.7%) people had no formal qualifications. The median income was $26,800, compared with $31,800 nationally. 159 people (10.8%) earned over $70,000 compared to 17.2% nationally. The employment status of those at least 15 was that 735 (49.8%) people were employed full-time, 234 (15.9%) were part-time, and 87 (5.9%) were unemployed.

Education
Hukerenui School Years 1–8 is a coeducational full primary (years 1–8) school with a roll of  students as of  The school was founded in 1889, and amalgamated with other small schools to a new site in 1949. Hukerenui School moved in 1975 to the site of the former Hukerenui District High School. It changed its name from "Hukerenui School" to "Hukerenui School Years 1–8" in 1997.

The school included a Form 3 class in 1946, and this was expanded into a secondary department. This eventually split to form the Hukerenui District High School, which operated from March 1957 to December 1972.

Notable people
Jim Lynch (born 1947), conservationist and cartoonist, grew up in Hūkerenui

Footnotes

Notes

References

External links
 Hukerenui School website

Whangarei District
Populated places in the Northland Region